Movin' with Nancy is the soundtrack album to Nancy Sinatra's 1967 television special of the same name, released on Reprise Records in 1967. It features guest appearances from Frank Sinatra, Dean Martin, and Lee Hazlewood. Arranged and conducted by Billy Strange, the album was produced by Lee Hazlewood. It peaked at number 37 on the Billboard 200 chart. "Some Velvet Morning" was released as a single from the album.

Track listing

Charts

References

External links
 
 

1967 soundtrack albums
Nancy Sinatra albums
Television soundtracks
Albums arranged by Billy Strange
Albums conducted by Billy Strange
Albums produced by Lee Hazlewood
Reprise Records soundtracks
Sundazed Records albums